The Joy of Painting is an American half-hour instructional television show created and hosted by painter Bob Ross which ran from January 11, 1983, to May 17, 1994. In most episodes, Ross taught techniques for landscape oil painting, completing a painting in each session. Occasionally, episodes featured a guest artist who would demonstrate a different painting technique. The program followed the same format as its predecessor from 1974 to 1982, The Magic of Oil Painting, hosted by Ross's mentor Bill Alexander.

Production
The show was aired and produced by non-commercial, public television stations. The first season aired in early 1983 and was produced by WNVC in Falls Church, Virginia. Starting in the second season in late 1983, the show was produced by WIPB in Muncie, Indiana, until its end in 1994, and later by Blue Ridge Public Television in Roanoke, Virginia. The show is currently being distributed by American Public Television. Reruns began syndication at PBS stations in the United States in 1992, under the moniker The Best of The Joy of Painting, featuring a collection of Bob Ross's favorite paintings from past seasons. By the early 1990s, nearly 300 episodes of The Joy of Painting were on the air in the United States on PBS and in Canada on CBC Television. The Joy of Painting would later begin broadcasting in different places around the world, such as Mexico, Costa Rica, Colombia, the United Kingdom, Latin America, Greece, the Netherlands, Germany, Switzerland, Austria, Turkey, Iran, South Korea, Australia, and Japan.

Format
At the beginning of each episode, the canvas was blank. The show featured many guest appearances from other painters, who painted alongside Ross, such as Dana Jester, Ross's son Steve, John Thamm, Audrey Golden, Joyce Ortner, Ben Stahl, Dorothy Dent, his business partner Annette Kowalski (who specialized in floral painting) and Diane Andre. Most episodes would begin with either a blank white canvas, or less often, a canvas pre-painted with black gesso; this blank canvas would be coated with a thin coat of liquid white paint (for a white canvas; Ross used Bill Alexander's proprietary Magic White in earlier seasons before going to a generic name later on) or a dark color (for black). If a painting was expected to take longer than the half-hour time slot, the earliest steps would be prepared before the episode started as Ross gave a cursory explanation of his canvas preparation. For shorter paintings, Ross would fill time by showing off animals such as his pet squirrel Peapod or videos of him at a nature preserve, or footage of Ross at a public event. Within the first few minutes of each show, the blank canvas has turned into a landscape, seascape and winter scenery, using the wet-on-wet technique, in which the painter adds still-wet paint, rather than waiting for each layer of paint to dry. Combining this method with the use of two-inch and other types of brushes, as well as painting knives, allowed him to paint trees, water, clouds, mountains, seascapes and winter scenery in a matter of seconds. The paintings featured colors that Ross had on the show, such as titanium white, phthalo green, phthalo blue, Prussian blue, midnight black, dark sienna, van dyke brown, burnt umber (discontinued in later seasons), alizarin crimson, sap green, cadmium yellow, yellow ochre, Indian yellow and bright red  (permanent red in earlier seasons).

Each painting started with criss-cross strokes, that appeared to be nothing more than the smudges of color. As more criss-cross were added, the blotches transformed into intricate paintings. While painting, he instructed viewers regarding the techniques that he was using, he was telling stories about the "happy little clouds", and "happy little trees", that he was creating. He would often attach human emotions to the objects he was painting; after painting a tree trunk, for example, Ross would usually add another nearby "because it needs a friend". He would occasionally present home video footage of himself with a baby deer, a raccoon and another small animal. Each program was shot in real time with two cameras: a medium shot of Ross and his canvas, and a close-up shot of the canvas or palette. At the end of each episode, Ross was known for saying something akin to, "...so, from all of us here, I'd like to wish you happy painting, and God bless, my friend...". Then, the show's theme song ("Interlude", a stock selection from Network Music, from season 2 onward) played, as the credits rolled over a shot of the finished and successful painting.

Ross created three versions of each painting. The first, done prior to taping, sat on an easel off-camera and was used as a template to create a second, which the viewers actually watched him paint, after taping he painted a more detailed third one for inclusion in his instructional books. All three were then donated to various PBS stations, the Smithsonian Institution, or kept by Bob Ross, Inc.

Episodes

Legacy
In 1994, Ross appeared on Bill Nye the Science Guy, where he did a self-parody segment entitled "The Artistic Eye with Bob Ross”.

As part of its launch of Twitch Creative, Twitch streamed every episode over a nine-day period starting on October 29, 2015what would have been Ross's 73rd birthday. Twitch reported that 5.6 million viewers, and due to its popularity, created a weekly rebroadcast of all 31 seasons of The Joy of Painting to air on Twitch each Monday from November 2015 onward, and will have a marathon of episodes each October 29. A portion of the advertising revenue has been promised to charities, including St. Jude Children's Research Hospital. This event was also repeated on October 29, 2016, for his 74th birthday.

In 2015, all 403 episodes of The Joy of Painting were added to the official Bob Ross YouTube channel.
In June 2016, Netflix repackaged several 1991–92 episodes of The Joy of Painting under the moniker Beauty Is Everywhere. A second package, titled Chill with Bob Ross, was added in December. In 2020, Tubi added 30 seasons of The Joy of Painting, totaling nearly 400 episodes, to its platform for free.

In November 2017, the first teaser trailer for the 2018 film Deadpool 2 was released, featuring a parody of The Joy of Painting with Ryan Reynolds as Deadpool.

The Joy of Painting has been licensed for merchandise, including a Chia Pet and a breakfast cereal made by the makers of Flutie Flakes.

The program returned to television on BBC Four as part of Culture Quarantine Programming with its first broadcast on April 20, 2020.

References

External links

 
 Unofficial The Joy of Painting database
 

1983 American television series debuts
1994 American television series endings
English-language television shows
American non-fiction television series
Works about painting
PBS original programming
Television series about art